Chlorisanis viridis is a species of beetle in the family Cerambycidae. It was described by Francis Polkinghorne Pascoe in 1867. It is known from Malaysia, Borneo and Java. It contains the varietas Chlorisanis viridis var. violaceosuturalis.

References

Saperdini
Beetles described in 1867